Shalasi is a rural locality (a selo) in Sutbuksky Selsoviet, Dakhadayevsky District, Republic of Dagestan, Russia. The population was 631 as of 2010. There are 5 streets.

Geography 
Shalasi is located 61 km northeast of Urkarakh (the district's administrative centre) by road. Gerga and Kayakent are the nearest rural localities.

Nationalities 
Dargins live there.

References 

Rural localities in Dakhadayevsky District